William Stewart McLean    (7 March 1941 in Scotland, UK – 6 August 2006 in Glasgow, Scotland, UK) was a much respected and admired Scottish actor, theatre administrator, and businessman.

In his early years, he made his mark as an accomplished businessman in the setting up and managing of photo processing firms across Scotland.  After which he pursued another passion of his, and some would say more enticing one, by working with stars of pantomime, drama, and musicals in the south of England.  He turned this passion of his into a permanent one when he went professional in the theatre world at the ripe young age of 52 in 1993.  As they say, he became the oldest new boy in the business.

Mr. McLean enjoyed the respect from every performer he worked with either as an actor and as a theatre administrator.  He worked with such UK stars as Allan Stewart, Andy Gray, Britt Ekland, Su Pollard, Gary Wilmot, Lesley Joseph, Dorothy Paul, and many others.

As an actor, he was busy in the arenas of television, theatre, and pantomime.  On the Scottish small screen he had roles in "Taggart", "Monarch of the Glen", "Doctor Finlay", "River City", "Rab C. Nesbitt" and many others.  In the theatre world, he worked on the UK tours of  "High Society", "See How They Run", and "A Happy Medium".  And in pantomime, he worked in "Cinderella", "Dick Whittington", "Aladdin", and "Peter Pan".

He was also a much respected tour and stage manager.  He worked in most of Scotland's most notable theatres such as The King's Theatre in Edinburgh, where he managed the annual pantomime show, which was about to celebrate its 100th Christmas season (2006), the Byre Theatre in St. Andrews, HM Theatre in Aberdeen, and the Adam Smith Theatre in Kirkcaldy.

Stewart McLean died on 6 August 2006 at his home in Glasgow's West End just a year after a heart bypass operation.  He was divorced and survived by a son and daughter and two grandchildren.

Selected TV Credits

Selected Stage Credits

Theatre Administration

As Company Manager involved with such tours as:

 "See How They Run"
 "The Goodbye Girl"
 "Singular Woman"
 "Ken Hill's Phantom of the Opera"
 "Double Double"
 "The Dragon Variation"
 "Cinderella"
 "Peter Pan"

External links

Stewart McLean Obituary

1941 births
2006 deaths
Scottish male stage actors
Scottish male television actors